Plzeň municipal election in 1998 was held as part of Czech municipal elections, 1998. It was held on 13 and 14 November 1998. The election was won by the Civic Democratic Party (ODS). Jiří Schneberger became the new Mayor. ODS was led by Jiří Šneberger while Czech Social Democratic Party (ČSSD) was led by university professor Josef Průša. ODS and ČSSD formed Grand coalition after the election.

Campaign
Civic Democrats focused on fight against gambling during campaign.

Results

References

External links
 Results

1998
1998 elections in Europe
1998 elections in the Czech Republic